Lo Tsz Tin is a village in Tai Po District, Hong Kong.

Administration
Lo Tsz Tin is a recognized village under the New Territories Small House Policy. It is one of the villages represented within the Tai Po Rural Committee. For electoral purposes, Lo Tsz Tin is part of the Shuen Wan constituency, which was formerly represented by So Tat-leung until October 2021.

History
Historically, Ting Kok, together with the nearby Hakka villages of Shan Liu, Lai Pik Shan, Lo Tsz Tin, Lung Mei and Tai Mei Tuk belonged to the Ting Kok Yeuk alliance.

References

External links

 Delineation of area of existing village Lo Tsz Tin (Tai Po) for election of resident representative (2019 to 2022)

Villages in Tai Po District, Hong Kong